Nikka Graff Lanzarone (born November 20, 1983) is an actress and dancer.

Early life 
On November 20, 1983, Lanzarone was born in Los Angeles, California. Lanzarone's mother is Ilene Graff, an actress. Lanzarone's father is Ben Lanzarone, a composer. Lanzarone is the niece of director and actor Todd Graff

Career
Lanzarone graduated from the Boston Conservatory with a degree in Musical Theatre. Her first professional performance following her education was in Jerry Mitchell's Peepshow in Las Vegas. Broadway saw her debut as Marisa in Women on the Verge of a Nervous Breakdown, based on the Pedro Almodóvar film of the same name. Her last Broadway performance was in Chicago as the iconic Velma Kelly.

Lanzarone starred as Mitzi the Nazi in the 2019 Off-Broadway revival of the Sherman Brothers' Over Here!. The production was directed by Will Nunziata with musical direction by Blake Allen and starred Tony Award winner Debbie Gravitte, Haley Swindal as Pauline, and Jessica Hendy as Paulette.

Theatre
Broadway
Women on the Verge of a Nervous Breakdown (2010)
Chicago (2011)
Off-Broadway
 Seussical The Musical (2011)
 Hello Again (2011)
Zorba! (City Center Encores!, 2015)
Sweet Charity (2016)

Select filmography
 Bandslam (2009) (Movie) ....  New Art Teacher
 Outside the Box (2011) .... Marion Crane (1 episode, 2014)
 Unforgettable (2014) .... Heather
 Divorce (2018)
 The Marvelous Mrs. Maisel  (2018) .... Myrna

References

External links

Video Nikka Graff
Debut Nikka graff lanzarone in Broadway

1984 births
American television actresses
Living people
American stage actresses
American film actresses
American musical theatre actresses
21st-century American women